Chargar (also known as Charkar) is a village in Sain Qaleh Rural District, in the Central District of Abhar County, Zanjan Province, Iran. At the 2006 census, its population was 853, in 238 families. Chargar is the site of epithermal metal ore deposits, which consist primarily of chalcopyrite and gold. The main gangue minerals are quartz, barite, and calcite. The ores are embedded in Eocene volcanic rocks which are classified as andesitic tuff and associated with the Karaj Formation. The Chargar deposit has similarities to the Khalifehlu and Aliabad-Khanchay deposits.

References 

Populated places in Abhar County